The Harvard–Yale hockey rivalry is a men's ice hockey sports rivalry between the Crimson of Harvard University and the Bulldogs of Yale University dating back to the 19th century.

Harvard and Yale play each other at least twice each season with most games at Harvard's Bright Hockey Center in Allston, Massachusetts and at Yale's Ingalls Rink in New Haven, Connecticut. Postseason meetings are common. Harvard and Yale have met more than 250 times on the ice with their first match coming on February 26, 1900.

Game results

Sources:
As of January 1, 2022.

Series facts

See also
College rivalry
Harvard Crimson
Yale Bulldogs

References

College ice hockey rivalries in the United States
Yale Bulldogs men's ice hockey
Harvard Crimson men's ice hockey